Senderos is an album by Argentine musician Dino Saluzzi with percussionist Jon Christensen recorded in 2002 and released by ECM Records.

Reception
The Allmusic review awarded by Thom Jurek awarded the album 4 stars stating "there is no other recording like this. It is a watershed marking a brilliant artist's return to recording, and a step outside his comfort zone that offers proof of the restless and poignant direction of his muse and his ability to translate it directly, honestly, and with passion". The All About Jazz review by John Kelman stated "Senderos is the kind of album that requires listeners to give up any notion of convention; it also expects them to permit themselves to be drawn into a world of delicate shadings and understatement. Senderos may be unconventional, but it is still approachable in its refined lyricism. One need only listen."

Track listing
All compositions by Dino Saluzzi except as indicated
 "Vientos" (Jon Christensen, Dino Saluzzi) - 7:19 
 "Imagines..." - 3:31 
 "Todos los Recuerdos" - 4:51 
 "Tus Ojos...!" - 6:17 
 "Detras de las Rejas...!" (Christensen, Saluzzi) - 4:52 
 "Los Ceibos de Mi Pueblo" - 4:31 
 "Aspectos" (Christensen, Saluzzi) - 4:36 
 "Huellas" - 5:26 
 "Ternuras" - 5:59 
 "Allá!...en los Montes Dormidos" - 5:17 
 "Tiempos" - 7:23 
 "Fantasia" - 6:08 
 "Formas" (Christensen, Saluzzi) - 8:02 
 "Eternidades -- Loca Bohemia" (Francisco de Caro, Saluzzi) - 4:46 
Recorded at Rainbow Studio in Oslo, Norway in November 2002

Personnel
Dino Saluzzi — bandoneón
Jon Christensen — drums, percussion

References

ECM Records albums
Dino Saluzzi albums
2003 albums
Albums produced by Manfred Eicher